Xiao Hailiang (born January 24, 1977, in Wuhan, Hubei) is a Chinese diver who won a bronze medal at the 1996 Summer Olympics.  He became an Olympic champion in the 3m Springboard Synchronized event at the 2000 Summer Olympics.

External links
 profile 

1977 births
Living people
Chinese male divers
Divers at the 1996 Summer Olympics
Divers at the 2000 Summer Olympics
Olympic gold medalists for China
Olympic bronze medalists for China
Olympic divers of China
Olympic medalists in diving
Asian Games medalists in diving
Sportspeople from Wuhan
Divers at the 1994 Asian Games
Medalists at the 2000 Summer Olympics
Medalists at the 1996 Summer Olympics
Asian Games silver medalists for China
Medalists at the 1994 Asian Games
Universiade medalists in diving
Universiade gold medalists for China
Medalists at the 1997 Summer Universiade
21st-century Chinese people
20th-century Chinese people